The Pacific Crest Trail (PCT), officially designated as the Pacific Crest National Scenic Trail, is a long-distance hiking and equestrian trail closely aligned with the highest portion of the Cascade and Sierra Nevada mountain ranges, which lie  east of the U.S. Pacific coast. The trail's southern terminus is next to the Mexico–United States border, just south of Campo, California, and its northern terminus is on the Canada–US border, upon which it continues unofficially to the Windy Joe Trail within Manning Park in British Columbia; it passes through the states of California, Oregon, and Washington.

The route passes through 25 national forests and 7 national parks. Its midpoint is near Chester, California (near Mt. Lassen), where the Sierra and Cascade mountain ranges meet.

It was designated a National Scenic Trail in 1968, although it was not officially completed until 1993. The PCT was conceived by Clinton Churchill Clarke in 1932. It received official status under the National Trails System Act of 1968.

The Pacific Crest Trail, the Appalachian Trail, and the Continental Divide Trail form what is known as the Triple Crown of Hiking in the United States. The Pacific Crest Trail is also part of the 6,875-mile Great Western Loop.

Route

The route is mostly through National Forest and protected wilderness. It also passes through seven national parks: Kings Canyon, Sequoia, Yosemite, Lassen Volcanic, Crater Lake, Mt. Rainier, and North Cascades. The trail avoids civilization and covers scenic and pristine mountainous terrain with few roads. It passes through the Laguna, Santa Rosa, San Jacinto, San Bernardino, San Gabriel, Liebre, Tehachapi, Sierra Nevada, and Klamath ranges in California, and the Cascade Range in California, Oregon, and Washington.

History

The Pacific Crest Trail was first proposed around 1932 by Clinton C. Clarke as a trail running from Mexico to Canada along the crest of the mountains in California, Oregon, and Washington. The original proposal was to link the John Muir Trail, the Tahoe–Yosemite Trail (both in California), the Skyline Trail (in Oregon) and the Cascade Crest Trail (in Washington).

The Pacific Crest Trail System Conference was formed by Clarke to both plan the trail and to lobby the federal government to protect the trail. The conference was founded by Clarke, the Boy Scouts, the YMCA, and Ansel Adams (amongst others). From 1935 through 1938, YMCA groups explored the 2,000 miles of potential trail and planned a route, which has been closely followed by the modern PCT route.

In recent years, Washington state clubwoman and educator Catherine T. Montgomery's contributions to the initial concept of the Pacific Coast Trail have been explored and she is known as the "Mother of the Pacific Coast Trail".

In 1968, President Lyndon B. Johnson defined the PCT and the Appalachian Trail with the National Trails System Act. The PCT was then constructed through cooperation between the federal government and volunteers organized by the Pacific Crest Trail Association. In 1993, the PCT was officially declared finished.

The Trust for Public Land has purchased and conserved more than  along the Pacific Crest Trail in Washington. Consolidation of this land has allowed for better recreational access as well as greater ease to manage conservation lands.

A bicycle touring route has been developed to parallel the PCT on paved and unpaved roads.

Thru-hiking
Thru-hiking is a term used in referring to hikers who complete long-distance trails from end to end in a single trip. Thru-hiking is a long commitment, usually taking between four and six months, that requires thorough preparation and dedication. The Pacific Crest Trail Association estimates that it takes most hikers between six and eight months to plan, train, and get ready for their trips. It is estimated the average completion rate is around 14%.

While most hikers travel from the southern terminus at the Mexico–US border northward to Manning Park, British Columbia, some hikers prefer a southbound route. In a normal weather year, northbound hikes are most practical due to snow and temperature considerations.  Additionally, some hiker services are seasonal and may be better timed for northbound hikers. If snowpack in the Sierra Nevada is high in early June and low in the Northern Cascades, some hikers may choose to 'flip-flop.' Flip-flopping can take many forms but often describes a process whereby a hiker begins at one end (on the PCT, usually the southern end) of the trail and then, at some point, like reaching the Sierra, 'flips' to the end of the trail at the Canada–US border and hikes southbound to complete the trail. However, it is not currently possible to legally enter the United States from Canada by using the Pacific Crest Trail.

Hikers also have to determine their resupply points. Resupply points are towns or post offices where hikers replenish food and other supplies such as cooking fuel. Hikers can ship packages to themselves at the U.S. Post Offices along the trail, resupply at general and grocery stores along the trail, or any combination of the two. The final major logistical step is to create an approximate schedule for completion. Thru hikers have to make sure they complete enough miles every day to reach the opposite end of the trail before weather conditions make sections impassable. For northbound thru-hikers, deep snow pack in the Sierra Nevada can prevent an early start. The timing is a balance between not getting to the Sierra too soon nor the Northern Cascades too late. Most hikers cover about 20 miles (32 km) per day.

In order to reduce their hiking time and thereby increase their chances of completing the trail, many hikers try to substantially reduce their pack weight. Since the creation of the Pacific Crest Trail there has been a large movement by hikers to get away from large heavy packs with a lot of gear. There are three general classifications for hikers: Traditional, Lightweight, and Ultralight.

Notable hikers
Before the PCT became an official trail, Martin Papendick was the first known person to hike across three states of the PCT in 1952. After being one of the first to finish the Appalachian Trail in 1951, Papendick hiked between July 4 and December 1, 1952, from British Columbia to the Mexico–US border over the crests of the mountains along the Pacific Coast, a feat he reported in a periodical under the title "Pacific Crest Trails".

On October 16, 1970, Eric Ryback, an 18-year-old student, completed the first PCT thru-hike. His personal congratulations came by telegram from Edward P. Cliff, Chief of the U.S. Forest Service. Ryback is credited, recognized, and has been honored by the Pacific Crest Trail Association as the official first thru-hiker of the entire trail. Ryback completed the Appalachian Trail in 1969 (as a 16-year-old); the Pacific Crest Trail in 1970; and a route approximating today's Continental Divide Trail in 1972. Ryback's 1971 book The High Adventure of Eric Ryback: Canada to Mexico on Foot focused public attention on the PCT. Ryback carried an 80-pound pack on his 1970 thru-hike. He had only five resupply packages on the entire trip and was loaded with 40 pounds of food at the start of each leg. He often ran out of food and foraged or went hungry. Ryback also helped the Forest Service lay out future plans for the PCT.

However, Ryback's claim is disputed. When the guidebook publisher Wilderness Press stated that Ryback had used motor transport in places along the PCT, Ryback sued for $3 million but withdrew the suit after Wilderness Press revealed statements from the people who claim to have picked up the young hiker along highways parallel to the 2,600-mile trail. Ryback is in Smithsonian's top 9 list of people Cheating Their Way to Fame though it notes that "the claims that Ryback 'cheated' are still doubted by some."

Richard Watson, who completed the trail on September 1, 1972, was often credited as the first PCT thru-hiker because Papendick was generally unknown and Ryback may have accepted rides. The first woman to complete the PCT was Mary Carstens, who finished the journey later in 1972, accompanied by Jeff Smukler.

The first person to thru-hike the entire PCT both ways in a single continuous round-trip was Scott Williamson, who completed the "yo-yo" circuit on his fourth attempt in November 2004. Williamson then went on to complete a second round trip on November 28, 2006, cutting two weeks off his 2004 time.

In 2014, Olive McGloin (from Ireland) became the first woman to thru-hike the PCT both ways in a single continuous round-trip.

The youngest person to hike the trail is Christian Thomas Geiger, who at the age of 6 completed the trail with his parents Andrea Rego and Dion Pagonis. Christian, also known by his trail name Buddy Backpacker, was also the youngest person to hike the Appalachian Trail until 2020.

Other notable young hikers include Sierra Burror and Reed Gjonnes.  Burror, who completed a continuous thru-hike of the trail in 2012 at the age of 9, is the youngest girl to thru-hike the trail. She completed her hike with her mother, Heather Burror. Gjonnes, who thru-hiked the trail in 2011 at age 11, went on to complete the Triple Crown of Hiking, becoming the youngest person ever to do so.

Teddi Boston hiked from Canada to Mexico on the PCT in 1976 at age of 49. She was one of the first women to hike the trail alone.

An autobiographical account of a woman hiking a portion of the PCT alone in 1995 at age 26 was written by Cheryl Strayed.  Her memoir Wild: From Lost to Found on the Pacific Crest Trail was published in 2012 and reached #1 on the New York Times Best Sellers list. Her hike is the subject of the 2014 film Wild, starring Reese Witherspoon.

The first two reported deaths on the Pacific Crest Trail were in November 1995, when thru-hikers Jane and Flicka Rodman were killed during a detour down California State Route 138 in Southern California, when they were struck by a motorist who lost control of his vehicle. They were less than 400 miles from their goal of reaching the Mexico–US border.

The oldest person to thru-hike the trail is not fully established, with multiple competing claims.

Fastest known times

On August 7, 2013, Heather "Anish" Anderson of Bellingham, Washington, set the unsupported speed record, which still stands as of July, 2021. She completed the PCT in 60 days, 17 hours, 12 minutes, beating the previous record by almost 4 days. She documented this journey in her book, "Thirst".  In 2018 she became the first woman to complete the Triple Crown of Hiking in a single calendar year.

On August 10, 2014, Joseph McConaughy of Shoreline, Washington, a former Boston College middle-distance runner, set a new supported speed record and the overall fastest known time for the PCT. The distance was covered in 53 days, 6 hours, and 37 minutes. This surpassed the previous record of 59 days, 8 hours, 14 minutes, set by Josh Garret on August 8, 2013, by more than 6 days. Joe was supported by a team of three hikers, Jordan Hamm (a former Boston College distance runner), Michael Dillon, and Jack Murphy.

McConaughy's record was broken on August 14, 2016, by Karel Sabbe, a 27-year-old dentist from Ghent, Belgium. He covered the distance in 52 days, 8 hours, and 25 minutes, averaging over 50 miles a day and shaving almost a day (22 hours) off the previous record set by McConaughy. Sabbe was supported by his friend Joren Biebuyck.

On July 22, 2021, 37-year-old ultra-runner Timothy Olson of Boulder, CA, broke Sabbe's record with a time of 51 days, 16 hours and 55 minutes, fifteen and a half hours faster than Sabbe's time. Olson was crewed by a small group of family and friends.

For their record runs, all of the recent finishers have had to take some official detours because of wildfires.

Equestrian use
Don and June Mulford made the first verifiable equestrian Thru-Ride of the PCT in 1959. In that year the Pacific Crest Trail stretched a poorly-marked 2,400 miles from Mexico to Canada. More concept than footpath, the trail was an oft-broken, high-ridge track disappearing regularly from map and terrain. On April 19, 1959, on an empty scrub sage plain seven miles east of Tijuana, with four horses, Don and June Mulford began their journey north to the Washington–Canada border. The Mulfords went to Hollywood for three months immediately after the ride and were featured on network television. June's old press book yields a half-dozen TV-Guide pages, and she recalls, "Art Linkletter was such a nice man. We appeared on his 'House Party' show and he had coffee with us afterward." High Road to Danger, a syndicated TV show, made an episode on their ride. Even after they had returned home to the Northwest, there was continued TV coverage. A January 1961 TV Guide records their appearance on Portland's KOIN Red Dunning Show. The Mulfords even made a 90-minute movie and showed it around 12 western states for 10 years.

The Murray family (Barry, Bernice, Barry Jr. and Bennette) completed the trek on horseback on October 7, 1970.

Future
In 2008, an agreement for realignment through Tejon Ranch in Southern California was reached. This realignment would relocate 37 miles of the PCT from the Mojave Desert floor to the more scenic Tehachapi Mountains. While an agreement was reached, the realignment is a long-term project; many details remain to be determined, as well as an Optimal Location Review—a lengthy process through which the ideal path for the new section of trail is specified. Actual relocation of the trail is unlikely to happen before 2021.

Portland, Oregon's 40-Mile Loop proposes to extend the Springwater Corridor hiking and bicycling spur trail to connect the Pacific Crest Trail with the proposed Cazadero Trail. Plans are currently in progress to add a dedicated pedestrian/equestrian lane to the Bridge of the Gods across the Columbia River. Currently, PCT hikers and equestrians must cross the bridge walking in vehicle traffic lanes—a potential danger which the new lane will eliminate. A completion date for this project is unknown.

Notable locations
The following notable locations are found along or adjacent to the route of the Pacific Crest Trail. They are listed from south to north to correspond with the itinerary typically followed by thru-hikers to take advantage of the best seasonal weather conditions.  The numbers in parentheses correspond to the numbers on the PCT overview map above.

California

 Campo, California, near the trail's southern terminus at the Mexico–United States border
 Anza-Borrego Desert State Park (41)
 Eagle Rock (near Warner Springs)
 Cleveland National Forest (40)
 Crystal Lake Recreation Area
 Windy Gap Trail (Angeles National Forest)
 Mount San Jacinto State Park (39)
 San Gorgonio Pass and Interstate 10 near Cabazon
 Big Bear Lake (37)
 Cajon Pass (36)
 Angeles National Forest (35)
 Vasquez Rocks
 Agua Dulce
 Tehachapi Pass
 Walker Pass
 Owens Peak Wilderness (34)
 South Sierra Wilderness (34)
 Golden Trout Wilderness (34)
 Kings Canyon National Park (33)
 Forester Pass, highest point on the trail
 John Muir Wilderness (31)
 Ansel Adams Wilderness (30)
 Devils Postpile National Monument
 Yosemite National Park (29)
 Tuolumne Meadows
 Sonora Pass, Ebbetts Pass, Carson Pass
 Desolation Wilderness
 Lassen National Forest (22)
 Lassen Volcanic National Park (23)
 McArthur-Burney Falls Memorial State Park (21)
 Shasta-Trinity National Forest (19)
 Castle Crags Wilderness (20)
 Klamath Mountains
 Trinity Alps Wilderness
 Russian Wilderness
 Marble Mountain Wilderness

Oregon

 Cascade–Siskiyou National Monument (17)
 Rogue River National Forest (16) and Winema National Forest (14)
 Sky Lakes Wilderness
 Crater Lake National Park (15)
 Crater Lake
 Umpqua National Forest (13)
 Mount Thielsen
 Willamette National Forest (11) and Deschutes National Forest (12)
 Diamond Peak Wilderness
 Waldo Lake
 Three Sisters Wilderness
 Dee Wright Observatory and McKenzie Pass
 Mount Washington Wilderness
 Mount Jefferson Wilderness
 Mount Hood National Forest (9)
 Olallie Scenic Area
 Warm Springs Indian Reservation (10)
 Timberline Lodge
 Mount Hood Wilderness
 Lolo Pass
 Columbia River Gorge National Scenic Area (8)
 Mark O. Hatfield Wilderness (formerly the Columbia Wilderness)
 Cascade Locks, Oregon, lowest point on the trail
 Bridge of the Gods (links Oregon and Washington, crossing the Columbia River)

Washington

 Gifford Pinchot National Forest (7)
 Indian Heaven Wilderness
Mount Adams Wilderness
 Mount Adams
 Goat Rocks Wilderness
Old Snowy Mountain
 White Pass
 Mount Rainier National Park (6)
 Chinook Pass
 Mount Baker-Snoqualmie National Forest (5)
 Norse Peak Wilderness
 Alpine Lakes Wilderness
Kendall Katwalk
 Henry M. Jackson Wilderness
 Glacier Peak Wilderness
Glacier Peak
 Snoqualmie Pass
 Stevens Pass
 Lake Chelan National Recreation Area
 Stehekin, Washington, last town along the trail,  from PCT by NPS bus
 North Cascades National Park (2)
 Okanogan–Wenatchee National Forest (3)
 Pacific Northwest National Scenic Trail
 Boundary Monument 78, at the Canada–United States border

British Columbia, Canada
 E. C. Manning Provincial Park (1), the northern terminus of the trail. Hikers crossing the border are required to have previously obtained the Canada PCT Entry Permit from  Canadian Border Services Agency.

Location coordinates

See also

Other Triple Crown trails
Appalachian Trail
Continental Divide Trail
Connected National Scenic Trail
Pacific Northwest Trail
Connected National Historic Trails
California Trail
Juan Bautista de Anza National Historic Trail
Lewis and Clark National Historic Trail
Old Spanish Trail
Oregon Trail
Pony Express National Historic Trail
Connected U.S. long-distance trails
High Sierra Trail
John Muir Trail
Mark O. Hatfield Memorial Trail
Oregon Skyline Trail
Tahoe–Yosemite Trail
Tahoe Rim Trail
Timberline Trail
Long-distance routes
Sierra High Route

References

External links

 Pacific Crest Trail Association – Non-profit that maintains and promotes the trail, and provides advice to hikers
 Postholer.Com – An extensive source of PCT information, journals, Google trail maps, printed maps, data book and more.
 PlanYourHike.Com – A website dedicated to helping hikers plan their Pacific Crest Trail thru hikes.
 Trailjournals.com – PCT Photos & 1,000+ Pacific Crest Trail Journals
 Pacific Crest Trail: A Ride to Remember Documentary produced by Oregon Public Broadcasting
 Islands In The Sky: Tales From The Pacific Crest Trail – KCET Covers the PCT
 Pacific Crest National Scenic Trail - BLM page

Hiking trails in California
Hiking trails in Oregon
Hiking trails in Washington (state)
Long-distance trails in the United States
National Scenic Trails of the United States
Hiking trails in British Columbia
Units of the National Landscape Conservation System